Power Without Glory is a 1950 historical novel written by Australian author Frank Hardy, following the life and ambitions of John West, a politician born into a working-class family who rises to prominence in Australian federal politics.

Following the novel's publication, Ellen Wren, the wife of bookmaker and businessman John Wren sued Hardy for libel, claiming that the characters of John West and his wife Nellie were modelled on the Wrens, and that Nellie's affair in the novel was libellous to Ellen Wren. Ultimately Hardy was cleared and publication allowed.

Publication 
The work was originally self-published, with illustrations by Hardy's friend "Amb" Dyson, with the subtitle "a novel in three parts by Frank J. Hardy, Ross Franklyn". "Ross Franklyn" was the pseudonym Hardy had always used prior to Power Without Glory. This combination of real name and pen name was also used in Hardy's 1961 book The Hard Way which describes the difficulties "Ross Franklyn" had in having the book published, and the problems Frank Hardy faced in answering the criminal libel charge against him arising from the publication.

Hardy was a member of the Communist Party of Australia, which features in the novel as the enemy of the protagonist. After the novel's publication, Hardy would run unsuccessfully for office as a member of the Communist Party.

Hardy wrote in his later work, The Hard Way, that he felt dissatisfied with the final chapters of the novel. In his desire to complete the long work at a manageable length for publication, and with the threats regarding the novel's publication, Hardy felt the final chapters were hurried.

Novel 
Power Without Glory follows the life of John West, who is born into an impoverished family in the fictitious Melbourne suburb of Carringbush, which is based on the actual suburbs of Abbotsford and Collingwood. When the novel opens, in 1893, West is twenty-four years old and already involved in criminal activities including gambling and bookmaking. The novel follows West's life as he rises to be a highly ambitious businessman and corrupt politician, as a powerbroker for the Australian Labor Party.

The novel is partly set during World War I, and the debate about conscription is a major issue in the novel. John West is a fierce patriot who supports conscription, and his sometimes fiery arguments with the Irish-Catholic Archbishop of Melbourne, who opposes conscription on the grounds that to send men to aid England was contrary to his, and Ireland's, historical enmity with that country.

West's family dramas are many: his brother Arthur spends time in jail for aiding and abetting a crime of rape, West's wife Nellie has an affair with a tradesman and falls pregnant with his child, and his daughter becomes a member of the Communist Party of Australia in the years after the War.

West's relationship with Communism is a hateful one, and he heavily finances the efforts of the (real life) anti-communist, Roman Catholic B.A. Santamaria. This crusade damages both his family fortunes and his marriage, and continues until West's death as an old man in 1950.

Characters
The novel can be considered a Roman à clef, or a novel in which many of the characters correlate with real-life figures of the time, including Victorian Premier Sir Thomas Bent and Prime Minister James Scullin.

The following list attempts to align Power Without Glory characters with real historical persons who may have been inspirational to the author. Recognisable features do not necessarily imply any attempt at an exact correlation. Hardy himself conceded or even affirmed some such correlations, but says in The Hard Way that many such lists were being created and passed around by parties without his involvement, perhaps even without his knowledge.

ASHTON, Frank — Frank Anstey, Labor politician and social propagandist
BACON, Snowy — Reginald Leslie (Snowy) Baker, fight promoter, sportsman, actor, soldier, and journalist ('versatile')
BENNETT (The Gentleman Thief) — Hon. W.J. Beckett, M.L.C. for Melbourne North, Melbourne East & Melbourne
BLACKWELL, Maurice — Maurice Blackburn, State Labor MP for Essendon, Fitzroy & Clifton Hill. Federal Labor M.P. for Bourke
BLAIRE — (Sir) Thomas Blamey, army general and Victorian Police Commissioner 1925–1936
BOND, Thomas — (Sir) Thomas Bent, 32nd Premier of Victoria 1904-1909
BRADY, William — Bill Barry, Victorian Labor M.P. for Carlton, minister in various Cain Governments
CALLINAN, Police Commissioner — Thomas O'Callaghan, Police Commissioner 1902–1913
CARR, John — John Cain, leader of Victorian Labor Party, Premier on three occasions
CONN (Archbishop) — Thomas Carr, Catholic archbishop of Melbourne preceding Daniel Mannix
CREGAN, J. — Jack Cremean, Federal M.P. for Hoddle
CUTTING, Slasher — John "Snowy" Cutmore, gunman and thief
DARBY, Lou — Les Darcy
DAVISON, Alfie — (Sir) Albert Dunstan, conservative Victorian Premier 1935 -1943
DWYER, Godfrey — (Sir) Gilbert Dyett, long-time President of the R.S.L.
GARSIDE, David — David Gaunson, prominent criminal solicitor
GIBBON, Sir S. — (Sir) Samuel Gillott, Chief Secretary in the Bent Cabinet
HORAN, Ned — Ned Hogan, twice Labor Premier of Victoria
JOLLY, Bob — Bob Solly, Labor M.P. for Carlton in Victorian Parliament for many years
KELLEHER, Paddy — Pat Kennelly, M.L.C. for Melbourne West; Federal Secretary, A.L.P.
KIELY, Michael — Stan Keon, Victorian Member for Richmond, later Federal M.P. for Yarra
LAMB, Richard — Dick Lean, manager of Melbourne Stadium
LANE — Jack Lang, NSW Labor leader and Premier
McCORKELL — William McCormack, Labor Premier of Queensland
MALONE, Daniel — (Dr.) Daniel Mannix, Catholic archbishop of Melbourne
MANSON, "Plugger" Pete — "Plugger" Bill Martin, cyclist
MURKETT, Kenneth — (Sir) Keith Murdoch, journalist & newspaper proprietor
PARKER, Oliver — Clyde Palmer, journalist on The Truth newspaper
REAL, T.J. — T. J. Ryan, Premier of Queensland
RENFREY, Sugar — Robert "Sugar" Roberts, Mayor of Collingwood
SANDOW — Ad Santel, champion wrestler
SQUEERS, Bill — Bill Squires, boxer
SUMMER, James — James Scullin, Labor M.P., Prime Minister 1929-32
SWINTON — (Sir) George Swinburne, engineer, politician and philanthropist
TANNER, Snoopy — Squizzy Taylor, gunman and thief
THURGOOD — "Red Ted" Theodore, Labor Premier of Queensland 1919-1925, federal Treasurer, mining and business magnate
TRUMBLEWOOD, Thomas — Tom Tunnecliffe, Labor M.P. for Collingwood, Speaker 1937-40
WEST family — Wren family
WILLIAMS, Detective — Detective Harry Herbert Wilson

Locations 
APSOM — Epsom Racecourse, Mordialloc
BAGVILLE STREET — Sackville Street, Collingwood
CARRINGBUSH — Collingwood
CHIRRABOO — Chillagoe, Queensland
JACKSON STREET — Johnston Street, Fitzroy and Collingwood
RALSTONE — Richmond (though note there has been a Ralston St in South Yarra – across the river from Richmond – since 1857 )
RICHTON — Richmond Racecourse
ROYAL OAK HOTEL — Royal Mail Hotel
SILVER STREET — Gold Street, Collingwood

Court case 
Hardy was tried for criminal libel in 1951 on the basis of the depiction in the novel of West's wife having an affair but he was acquitted by jury, after putting a number of arguments and cross-examining witnesses. It was the last prosecution for criminal (as opposed to civil) libel in Victoria.

The case attracted enormous publicity, coinciding as it did with the anti-Communist referendum and served mainly to give the novel and any negative portrayal of Wren greater prominence. Hardy readily conceded that he had published the work, and so the defense was built on the remaining two points, of whether the informant Ellen Wren was in fact identical with the character Nellie West, and if so, whether in fact the publication was defamatory.

Witnesses had testified that they recognized Ellen in the character of Nellie, and that she had been defamed. Hardy's successful defense, as described in The Hard Way, argued that while the character of John West had character traits of John Wren, he was also an amalgam of ideas, with many events in the story not correlating to Wren's life. Hardy argued that if John Wren was not solely based on John West, then the character's wife could not solely be based on Ellen Wren. Hardy was acquitted of all charges, and the novel was published to a wider audience than its initial publication.

Historians have debated whether Ellen Wren did actually have an affair and conceive an illegitimate son, as in the novel. In The Hard Way, Hardy denied ever having spoken to any member of the Wren family during his extensive research for the book, claiming the affair was entirely fictional. However in 2005, Monash University academic Jenny Hocking claimed to have discovered archival material supporting the argument that Ellen Wren did indeed have an affair with a tradesperson, and that Hardy may have had knowledge of the affair.

TV series adaptation 
In 1976, the novel was made into a 26-episode ABC-TV series starring Martin Vaughan as West. While Nellie's affair with the brickie is depicted, the affair does not produce a child. The series won numerous Logie, Penguin and Sammy Awards.

Hardy wrote several books examining his experiences arising from writing Power Without Glory, including The Hard Way: The Story Behind Power without Glory (1961), Who Shot George Kirkland?: A Novel About the Nature of Truth (1981), and But the Dead are Many: A Novel in Fugue Form (1975). In these a central theme is the ambiguity between truth and fiction.

References

External links

 Hollywood Ten, Melbourne One, 1985, Daryl Dellora, CA Film and TV Digital Archive Project, Published on YouTube May 31, 2016.

Political history of Australia
1950 Australian novels
1970s Australian television miniseries
1976 Australian television series debuts
1976 Australian television series endings
Australian Broadcasting Corporation original programming
Television shows set in Victoria (Australia)
Australian thriller novels
Roman à clef novels
Organised crime in Melbourne
Novels set in Melbourne
Self-published books